Heesbach (also: Hees) is a small river of North Rhine-Westphalia, Germany. It flows into the Littfe in Kreuztal.

See also
List of rivers of North Rhine-Westphalia

Rivers of North Rhine-Westphalia
Rivers of Siegerland
Rivers of Germany